is a Japanese anime and tokusatsu drama screenwriter who has been involved in various television shows throughout her career, beginning in 1993 with Tokusou Robo Janperson.

In September 2022, Kobayashi launched a new manga series with illustrations by Saki Nonoyama titled Danzai Lock in Kodansha's Comic Days website.

Filmography

Television
Since her debut writing credits in Janperson, Kobayashi has been the main writer on many anime and tokusatsu television series and films. She has also been a writer on individual episodes within other series. Her credits as head writer are listed below in bold.

Anime television series
Hell Teacher Nube (1997)
Yu-Gi-Oh! (1998)
Angel Links (1999)
Dinozaurs (2000)
Gear Fighter Dendoh (2000–2001)
I My Me! Strawberry Eggs (2001)
Galaxy Angel (2001)
Galaxy Angel Z (2002)
Cyborg 009: The Cyborg Soldier (2002)
Pita-Ten (2002)
Panyo Panyo Di Gi Charat (2002)
Seven of Seven (2002)
 Galaxy Angel AA (2003)
 Galaxy Angel S (2003)
Gilgamesh (2003)
Di Gi Charat Nyo! (2003–2004)
Galaxy Angel X (2004)
Genshiken (2004)
Gokusen (2004)
Sgt. Frog (2005)
Guyver: The Bioboosted Armor (2005–2006)
Shakugan no Shana (2005–2006)
009-1 (2006)
Kamisama Kazoku (2006)
Witchblade (2006) 
Yume Tsukai (2006)
Death Note (2006–2007)
Claymore (2007)
Princess Resurrection (2007)
Shakugan no Shana Second (2007-2008)
Blassreiter (2008)
Casshern Sins (2008–2009)
Shakugan no Shana Final (2011-2012)
JoJo’s Bizarre Adventure (2012-2013)
Attack on Titan (2013–2019)
Garo: The Carved Seal of Flames (2014–2015)
 JoJo%27s Bizarre Adventure: Stardust Crusaders (2014-2015)
 JoJo%27s Bizarre Adventure: Diamond Is Unbreakable (2016)
Kakegurui (2017)
 JoJo%27s Bizarre Adventure: Golden Wind (2018-2019)
 Kakegurui ×× (2019)
Dororo (2019)
JoJo%27s Bizarre Adventure: Stone Ocean (2021-2022)

Live action television
Tokusou Robo Janperson (1993)
Blue SWAT (1994)
Juukou B-Fighter (1995–1996)
B-Fighter Kabuto (1996–1997)
Denji Sentai Megaranger (1997–1998)
Seijuu Sentai Gingaman (1998–1999)
Kyuukyuu Sentai GoGoFive (1999-2000)
Mirai Sentai Timeranger (2000–2001)
Kamen Rider Agito (2001)
Kamen Rider Ryuki (2002–2003)
Pretty Guardian Sailor Moon (2003–2004)
GoGo Sentai Boukenger (2006)
Kamen Rider Den-O (2007–2008)
Kamen Rider Decade (2009)
Samurai Sentai Shinkenger (2009–2010)
Kamen Rider OOO (2010–2011)
Garo: Makai Senki (2011)
Tokumei Sentai Go-Busters (2012–2013)
Zero: Black Blood (2014)
Ressha Sentai ToQger (2014–2015)
Kamen Rider Amazons (2016–2017)
 Thus Spoke Kishibe Rohan (2020-present)

Films

Anime
Yu-Gi-Oh! (1999)
Digimon Tamers: Battle of Adventurers (2001)
Shakugan no Shana The Movie (2007)
Trigun: Badlands Rumble (2010)
Hayate the Combat Butler! Heaven Is a Place on Earth (2011)
 Attack on Titan (2014-2020)
 Part 1: Crimson Bow and Arrow (2014)
 Part 2: Wings of Freedom (2015)
 The Roar of Awakening (2018)
 Chronicle (2020)
Garo: Divine Flame (2018)

OVAs
 Shakugan no Shana SP (2006)
 Shakugan no Shana S (2009-2010)

Live action
Kamen Rider Den-O: I%27m Born! (2007)
Kamen Rider Den-O %26 Kiva: Climax Deka (2008)
Saraba Kamen Rider Den-O: Final Countdown (2008)
Cho Kamen Rider Den-O %26 Decade Neo Generations: The Onigashima Warship (2009)
Samurai Sentai Shinkenger The Movie: The Fateful War (2009)
Samurai Sentai Shinkenger vs. Go-onger: GinmakuBang!! (2010)
Kamen Rider × Kamen Rider × Kamen Rider The Movie: Cho-Den-O Trilogy (2010)
Episode Red: Zero no Star Twinkle
Episode Blue: The Dispatched Imagin is Newtral
Kamen Rider OOO Wonderful: The Shogun and the 21 Core Medals (2011)
Kamen Rider × Kamen Rider Fourze  %26 OOO: Movie War Mega Max (2011)
 Kamen Rider OOO: Ankh’s Resurrection, the Medals of the Future, and the Leading Hope
Tokumei Sentai Go-Busters the Movie: Protect the Tokyo Enetower! (2012)
Ressha Sentai ToQger the Movie: Galaxy Line S.O.S. (2014)
Ressha Sentai ToQger vs. Kyoryuger: The Movie (2015)
Touken Ranbu (2019)

References

External links

 Yasuko Kobayashi anime at Media Arts Database 

1965 births
Living people
Anime screenwriters
Japanese women screenwriters
People from Tokyo
People from Kōtō